Bernard Kamungo (born 1 January 2002) is a Tanzanian professional footballer who plays as a midfielder for Major League Soccer club FC Dallas.

Club career
Born in Kasulu, Kamungo and his family had lived in a refugee camp before being able to relocate to the United States and settle in Abilene, Texas. After moving to the United States, Kamungo was a member of the Abilene High School soccer team. Following his graduation from high school, Kamungo, alongside his brother Imani, began searching online for potential tryouts for Bernard. After seeing tryouts elsewhere with participation fees as high as $500, Imani found a tryout with North Texas SC, the reserve team for MLS side FC Dallas, for only a $90 fee. During that January 2021 trial, Kamungo impressed North Texas head coach Eric Quill and was signed to a professional contract on 25 March.

On 24 April 2021, Kamungo made his debut against Fort Lauderdale CF, coming on as a 71st minute substitute for Hope Avayevu. Eight minutes after coming onto the pitch, Kamungo scored his first professional goal as the match would end in a 4–2 victory.

On 30 August 2022, Kamungo signed a four-year contract with FC Dallas.

Career statistics

References

External links
 Profile at FC Dallas

2002 births
Living people
People from Kigoma Region
Tanzanian footballers
Association football midfielders
North Texas SC players
FC Dallas players
USL League One players
MLS Next Pro players
Major League Soccer players
Tanzanian emigrants to the United States
Soccer players from Texas
Sportspeople from Abilene, Texas